Scutellastra aphanes is a species of sea snail, a true limpet, a marine gastropod mollusk in the family Patellidae, one of the families of true limpets.

Description

Distribution

References

Patellidae
Gastropods described in 1986